HMS Loyal  was a  built for the Royal Navy during the 1910s.

Description
The Laforey class was the improved and faster versions of the preceding . They displaced . Loyal was powered by two Parsons direct-drive steam turbines, each driving one propeller shaft, using steam provided by four Yarrow boilers. The ships' complement was 74 officers and ratings.

The ships were armed with three single QF  Mark IV guns and two QF 1.5-pounder (37 mm) anti-aircraft guns. These guns were later replaced by a pair of QF 2-pounder (40 mm) "pom-pom" anti-aircraft guns. The ships were also fitted with two above-water twin mounts for  torpedoes. They were equipped with rails to carry four Vickers Elia Mk IV mines, although these rails were never used.

Construction and service

The ship was laid down as Orlando at William Denny and Brothers' Dumbarton shipyard on 16 September 1912. The whole class was then renamed with names beginning with the letter "L" on 30 September 1913, with Orlando being renamed Loyal. Loyal was launched on 11 November 1913 and completed in May 1914.

Loyal joined the 3rd Destroyer Flotilla after commissioning.  On the outbreak of the First World War this Flotilla became part of the Harwich Force, under the overall command of Commodore Reginald Tyrwhitt, which operated in the southern North Sea and could reinforce the Grand Fleet or forces in the English Channel as required.

The ship was attached to the Harwich Force and served in the North Sea. Loyal saw action in several engagements, including the Battle off Texel.

Notes

Bibliography

External links
 

 

Laforey-class destroyers (1913)
1913 ships
World War I destroyers of the United Kingdom
Ships built on the River Clyde